Jana Novotná and Kathy Rinaldi were the defending champions but did not compete together. Novotná competed with Andrea Temesvári and Rinaldi competed with Tracy Austin, but both paired were eliminated in the round robin.

Martina Navratilova and Helena Suková defeated Ilana Kloss and Rosalyn Nideffer in the final, 6-3, 6-2 to win the ladies' invitation doubles tennis title at the 2009 Wimbledon Championships.

Draw

Final

Group A
Standings are determined by: 1. number of wins; 2. number of matches; 3. in two-players-ties, head-to-head records; 4. in three-players-ties, percentage of sets won, or of games won; 5. steering-committee decision.

Group B
Standings are determined by: 1. number of wins; 2. number of matches; 3. in two-players-ties, head-to-head records; 4. in three-players-ties, percentage of sets won, or of games won; 5. steering-committee decision.

External links
 Draw

Women's Invitation Doubles